The Hadhrami League ( al-ʿosbah al-ḥaḍramiyah) is a movement founded in 2003 under the name of the National Organization for the Liberation of Hadhramaut in Hadhramaut Governorate by Abdullah Saeed Bahaj and called for the self-determination of Hadhramaut residents at home and abroad and the legitimate rights of the People of Hadrami under international laws, foremost of which is the right to Self-determination and the Restoration of its independent State. Hadhramaut was an semi-autonomous British protectorate occupied by South Yemen first in 1967 and again in 1990. After unification between the two Northern and Southern States. The Hadhrami League considers it a "Yemeni occupation".

See also
 Hadhrami people
 Hadramaut Insurgency
 Protectorate of South Arabia

References

2007 establishments in Yemen
Arab militant groups
Arab separatism
Independence movements
Organizations established in 2007
Organizations of the Arab Spring
Organizations of the Yemeni Crisis (2011–present)
Rebel groups in Yemen
Separatism in Yemen
Secessionist organizations
Yemeni Revolution